Romualds Kalsons (born Riga, September 7, 1936) is a Latvian composer.  A former student of Ādolfs Skulte and Jāzeps Lindbergs, he taught at the Latvian Academy of Music from 1973 until 2009.  He is known for his opera Pazudušais dēls (The Prodigal Son), after the play by Rūdolfs Blaumanis, and for his orchestral music.

References
Teātris un kino biogrāfijās: Enciklopēdija / sast. un galv. red. Māra Niedra; māksl. Aleksandrs Busse. — Rīga : Preses nams, 2004. — (Latvija un latvieši). 2.sēj. — 1999. — 462 lpp. : il.  (Latvian)
Biography and list of works at Musica Baltica Ltd.

1936 births
Living people
Latvian composers
Musicians from Riga